The 1999 IIHF World U18 Championships was the first of its kind, It was held between April 8 and 18, 1999, in Füssen and Kaufbeuren, Germany. It replaced the European Under 18 Championship at the top two levels (which had run since 1977), by including one nation, the United States. Below the top two levels (Divisions A & B) two tiers of European divisions played, as well as two tiers of Asian divisions.

Division A

First round

7-10 place

1-6 place

Final standings
 1.  Finland
 2.  Sweden
 3.  Slovakia
 4.  Switzerland
 5.  Czech Republic
 6.  Russia
 7.  United States
 8.  Ukraine
 9.  Germany
 10.  Norway

Norway was relegated to Division B for 2000.

Division B

Final round

Final ranking 

Belarus was promoted to Division A, and both Hungary and Great Britain were relegated to the European Division I, for 2000.

European Championships Division I

First round

Placing round 

Latvia was promoted to Division B, and both Croatia and Yugoslavia were relegated to the European Division II, for 2000.

European Championships Division II

First round

Placing round 

Spain was promoted to the European Division I for  2000.

Asia-Oceania Division I

Japan was promoted to Division B for 2000.

Asia-Oceania Division II

First round

Semi-finals
North Korea 29 - 0 Chinese Taipei
South Africa 15 - 0 New Zealand

Finals
3rd place: New Zealand 26 - 4 Chinese Taipei
1st place: North Korea 9 - 1 South Africa

North Korea was promoted to Asia-Oceania Division I for 2000.

All-Star Team
Source: EliteProspects
Ari Ahonen (Goaltender)
David Jobin (Defence)
Niklas Kronwall (Defence)
Mikko Hyytiä (Centre)
Marián Gáborík (Winger)
Milan Bartovič (Winger)

References

External links
Full results (and explanation in french)
Official results (archived)

IIHF World U18 Championships
Iihf World U18 Championships, 1999
World
1999
April 1999 sports events in Europe
Ice hockey in Bavaria